Planomicrobium koreense is a bacterium, the type species of its genus. It was first isolated from jeotgal, a Korean dish, hence its name. Its type strain is JG07T.

References

Further reading
De Vos, Paul. Endospore-forming soil bacteria. Ed. Niall A. Logan. Vol. 27. Springer, 2011. 
Horikoshi, Koki, ed. Extremophiles Handbook:... Vol. 1. Springer, 2011.

External links

LPSN
Type strain of Planomicrobium koreense at BacDive -  the Bacterial Diversity Metadatabase

Bacillales
Bacteria described in 2001